The White Oak Pocosin is a large swamp in northern Onslow County and southern Jones County, North Carolina in the United States. It provides the headwaters of the White Oak River. The word pocosin is a Native American word meaning "swamp".

Landforms of Jones County, North Carolina
Swamps of North Carolina
Landforms of Onslow County, North Carolina
Pocosins